The Tulsa Oilers are a professional ice hockey team currently playing in the ECHL.  The ECHL Oilers' ownership group also owns another team called the Tulsa Oilers, a professional indoor football team currently playing in the Indoor Football League.

Tulsa Oilers may also refer to:

Tulsa Oilers (1964–1984), defunct professional ice hockey team which played 20 seasons in the original Central Hockey League.
Tulsa Oilers (1928–51), defunct professional ice hockey team that started in the American Hockey Association.
Tulsa Oilers (baseball), defunct minor league baseball team which played off-and-on from 1905 to 1976.
Tulsa Oilers (IFL)